Virginio Cáceres Villalba (born 21 May 1962 in Itacurubí del Rosario) is a retired football defender from Paraguay.

Cáceres started his career in the regional league team from the San Pedro Department and arrived in Asunción at the start of 1984 and signed for Club Guaraní. He soon made an impact and helped the team capture the 1984 Paraguayan league title. In 1990, he signed for Olimpia Asunción, where he would eventually play until his retirement in 2002. In his at Olimpia he won several national and international titles that established him as one of the club's important players.

Virginio Cáceres was also of the Paraguay national football team that participated in the 1986 FIFA World Cup. Virginio also played several Copa América tournaments representing Paraguay.

Titles
 Paraguayan League: 1984 (with Guaraní), 1993, 1995, 1997, 1998, 1999, 2000 (with Olimpia)
 Supercopa Sudamericana: 1990 (with Olimpia)
 Recopa Sudamericana: 1990 (with Olimpia)
 Copa Libertadores: 2002 (with Olimpia)
 Recopa Sudamericana: 2003 (with Olimpia)

References
 Club Olimpia Profile
 Virginio Caceres DOB
 rsssf

1962 births
Living people
Paraguayan footballers
Paraguayan Primera División players
Club Guaraní players
Club Olimpia footballers
Association football defenders
Paraguay under-20 international footballers
Paraguay international footballers
1986 FIFA World Cup players
1987 Copa América players
1989 Copa América players